Caroline Proust (born 18 November 1967) is a French classically trained actress best known to international audiences for her role as Captain Laure Berthaud in the French TV series Spiral. She has also appeared in the TV series The Tunnel as well as theatre work including the Tracy Letts play August: Osage County and Game of Love and Chance.

Early life and career

She was born on 18 November 1967 in the commune (or town) of Le Vigan in the region of Languedoc-Roussillon, in the department of Gard. She decided to be an actor when she was 17.

Proust initially worked in theatre. She has described herself as a child of Edward Bond, and she cites the directors Patrice Chéreau, Peter Brook, Giorgio Strehler and Deborah Warner among her inspirations.

Theatre

Filmography

TV
Proust's main TV work has been the series Spiral.

Personal life 

She was married to fellow actor Clovis Cornillac from 1994 until 2010. Their twins, Alice and Lily, were born in 2001. The couple appeared together in the 2007 feature film Scorpion.

References

External links 
 
 Spiral: meet the stylish star of BBC4's grimy French cop drama published January 10, 2015 in Radio Times

1967 births
Living people
People from Le Vigan, Gard
French television actresses
French film actresses
French stage actresses